George William Lewis Jr. (born March 30, 1983), better known by his stage name Twin Shadow, is a Dominican-American singer, songwriter, record producer, and actor based in Los Angeles. He has released five studio albums to date: Forget (2010), Confess (2012), Eclipse (2015), Caer (2018), and Twin Shadow (2021).

Biography

Early life and career beginnings (1983–2009)
Lewis was born March 30, 1983 in the Dominican Republic and raised in Florida. Lewis's first exposure to music started by singing in his church choir.

Around 2000, he moved to Boston and started the band Mad Man Films alongside Joseph Ciampini (drums) (of Hooray For Earth) and Zak Longo (bass) of Before Lazers. Mad Man Films released two records independently. In 2006, not satisfied with recording music for theatre and films, Lewis moved to Brooklyn, NY, and started the Twin Shadow project.

Forget (2010–2011)
Lewis's debut album, Forget, was released November 15, 2010, on Terrible Records. The album was produced by Chris Taylor of Grizzly Bear.

Forget received critical acclaim, appearing on numerous "album of the year" lists including Pitchfork (#26) and Stereogum (#32). It has been described as "steeped in 1980s new wave", "building from streaks of haunting synth textures", having "sophisticated melodies", "R&B intimacy", and "poetic lyrics", and "hazily new wave-tinged pop". Twin Shadow was the Rolling Stone Band of the Week on October 7, 2010.

Confess (2012–2013)

On July 10, 2012, Lewis released his follow-up album, Confess, which he produced himself. Lewis gained inspiration for the album after being involved in a motorcycle accident in Boston. Two of the album's songs, "Five Seconds" and "Patient", were transformed into a music video saga which drew inspiration from Lewis's novel Night of the Silver Sun. The A.V. Club described the album as "filled with Morrissey-esque yelps and Human League-worthy choruses, [...] Twin Shadow manages to digest his influences rather than simply replicate them. Confess retains the humid fog that saturated Forget, but the instrumentation is brighter, louder, and sharper. Synthesizers punch through the atmosphere, and Lewis' exquisite croon floats above it all."

The album debuted on Billboard 200 at No. 54, and on the Top Rock Albums chart at No. 18. The album has sold 30,000 copies in the US as of March 2015.

Eclipse and Night Rally (2014–2016)
After criticising his own work for being too elitist, Lewis set out to create a more approachable album, Eclipse. It was his first with a major record label, Warner Music. Carl Wilson of Billboard Magazine notes that Twin Shadow has left behind much of his "foggy layers of synths and drum machines" reminiscent of the likes of Depeche Mode and Simple Minds in favor of a more contemporary sound.

Eclipse is also noted for Lewis' almost complete departure from guitar playing, a conscious decision according to a Pitchfork interview in January 2015.

In March 2015, NPR exclusively streamed the album and Twin Shadow was live in session at KCRW on their "Morning Becomes Eclectic" segment. In April 2015, Eclipse was made WFUV AAA radio album of the month, Lewis was featured in Interview magazine as part of their Pop Craft feature. He was also featured on the cover of Culture Collide's Travel with Purpose magazine. Eclipse also marks the first album of Twin Shadow's to include creative direction by Milan Zrnic. Zrnic photographed all of the imagery associated with the album and consulted on all video content, tour staging, merchandise, and styling.

"To the Top", a song from Eclipse, was featured in the trailer for the film Paper Towns, produced by the same team as The Fault in Our Stars and starring Cara Delevingne and Nat Wolff.

On April 17, 2015, Twin Shadow and his band and crew were involved in a tour bus crash. Both driver John Crawford and drummer Andy Bauer were hospitalized and in serious condition. Lewis underwent reconstructive hand surgery following the accident.

On July 28, 2015, Twin Shadow released the Night Rally mixtape for free online, in conjunction with the announcement of the Night Rally Tour. Due to Bauer's severe injuries from the April bus crash, the band retooled the songs in the live set, with samples and a drum machine to keep time. Twin Shadow departed on their Night Rally Tour in August 2015 through the United States and Canada, and opened a portion of the Fall 2015 Death Cab for Cutie United States tour.
Night Rally consists of recordings from 2010 to 2014. During his healing time in Los Angeles following the bus crash, Lewis began to rummage through old hard drives. He left a message under the mixtape on SoundCloud, expressing how his discovery gave him a glimpse into the past five years:

The more I dug the more I realized how much music was made in the last 5 years. Being home I had the time and perspective to enjoy all the little impulses, embarrassing choices, and exciting moments that I couldn't bottle. There were also some songs that I couldn't understand why I never finished."

Caer, "Hollow Days", Broken Horses (2018)
Twin Shadow released his fourth studio album, Caer, on April 27, 2018, which was his final album with Warner Bros. On October 26, 2018, Twin Shadow launched his own label Cheree Cheree with the release of "Hollow Days", which incorporates the bachata sounds of his home country (the Dominican Republic) mixed with American songwriting. An EP titled Broken Horses was released on December 26, 2018.

Twin Shadow (2021)
Twin Shadow released his fifth studio album, Twin Shadow, on July 9, 2021, on his own label, Cheree Cheree. According to a press release quoted by Paste magazine, the self-titled album "represents Lewis' biggest sonic shift to date and finds the artist reexamining the cherished sounds of the golden era of soul and punk that were part of his musical upbringing and embracing his Dominican heritage, recording portions of the album at FAMA Studios in the Dominican Republic".

Personal life
Lewis has written a novel called The Night of the Silver Sun.

Fashion
Fashion is a notable outside interest for Lewis, as chronicled by The New York Times, who stated that Lewis is "giving Kanye West a run for his money as the music world's leading fashion dilettante." Twin Shadow was a featured musician in Levi's "Live in Levi's" ad campaign. Since 2010, he has served as a muse and composer for Dao-Yi Chow and Maxwell Osbourne, the designers of the CFDA-award-winning line "Public School". In 2015, Twin Shadow composed the music for their Spring/Summer 2015 and Spring/Summer 2016 runway shows, which took place during New York Fashion Week. In addition to composing music for Public School, George Lewis Jr. has modeled for the clothing brand, both on and off the runway.

Discography

Studio albums

EPs
 Broken Horses (2018)

Mixtapes
 Night Rally (2015)

Singles
 "Yellow Balloon" (2010)
 "Castles in the Snow" (2010)
 "I Can't Wait" (2010)
 "Slow" (2010)
 "At My Heels" (2010)
 "Changes" (2011 – non-album single)
 "Five Seconds" (2012)
 "Patient" (2012)
 "The One" (Live on KCRW) (2012)
 "Old Love / New Love" featuring D'Angelo Lacy (2013 – non-album single)
 "To the Top" (2014)
 "Turn Me Up" (2015)
 "I'm Ready" (2015)
 "Saturdays" featuring Haim (2018)
 "Little Woman" (2018)
 "Brace" featuring Rainsford (2018)
 "Hollow Days" (2018 – non-album single)
 "Only for the Broken-Hearted" (2019 – non-album single)
 "Truly" (2019 – non-album single)
 "Crushed" (2019 – non-album single)
 "Slave" (2020 – non-album single)
 "Johnny & Jonnie" (2021)
 "Alemania" (2021)
 "Get Closer" (2021)
 "Sugarcane / Lonestar" (2021)

Remixes

 Goldfrapp – Thea (Twin Shadow Remix)
 Surfer Blood – Floating Vibes (Twin Shadow Remix)
 N.E.R.D. Feat. Daft Punk – Hypnotize Remix (Twin Shadow Remix)
 Gypsy & The Cat – Jona Vark Remix (Twin Shadow Remix)
 Bear in Heaven – Lovesick Teenagers (Twin Shadow Remix)
 Oh Land – White Nights (Twin Shadow Remix)
 Lady Gaga – Born This Way (Twin Shadow Remix)
 MS MR – Hurricane (Twin Shadow Remix)
 Neon Indian – Psychic Chasms (Twin Shadow Remix)
 Neon Indian – Hex Girlfriend (Twin Shadow Remix)
 Wim – See You Hurry (Twin Shadow Remix)
 Hooray for Earth – "Surrounded By Your Friends (Twin Shadow Remix)
 Sky Ferreira – Everything Is Embarrassing (Twin Shadow Remix)
 SKATERS – Deadbolt (Twin Shadow Remix)
 Transviolet- Girls Your Age (Twin Shadow Remix)
 Alt-J Feat. Pusha-T – In Cold Blood (Twin Shadow Remix)

Collaborations
 On the limited edition version of Twin Shadow's Forget, there's a collaboration with Hooray for Earth called "A Place We Like"
 A Twin Shadow remix of Neon Indian's "Psychic Chasms" appears on the band's Mind Ctrl: Psychic Chasms Possessed
 A Twin Shadow remix of Neon Indian's "Hex Girlfriend" appears on that band's ERRATA ANEX EP
 The iTunes Store edition of Haim's Days Are Gone includes the bonus track "Edge", a song co-written by Lewis
 Flume released a mixtape as part of the deluxe edition of his self-titled album. Twin Shadow was featured on the track "Sleepless"
 Twin Shadow sings lead on "Lost You" and "Stardust", both of which are anthemic tracks from the Canadian festival-dance producers Zeds Dead
 Twin Shadow and D'Angelo Lacy collaborated with Wrestlers on the single "Say Anything", which was released on Record Store Day (April 19, 2014) on a Red Bull Sound Select limited edition split 7-inch
 Twin Shadow was featured on Big Data's track "Perfect Holiday" from their debut album 2.0
 Twin Shadow sings in two of Mickey Moonlight's songs for the album and the Time Axis Manipulation Corporation under his birth name George Lewis Jr.
 Twin Shadow appears in the Rainsford single "Intentions" from her 2018 EP Emotional Support Animal.

Covers
In 2013, Twin Shadow launched the UNDER THE CVRS series in which he covers requested songs from various artists.
 "I'm Not in Love" (10cc cover) August 2013
 "I'm on Fire" (Bruce Springsteen cover) September 2013
 "Silent All These Years" (Tori Amos cover) September 2013
 "Perfect Day" (Lou Reed cover) October 2013
 "With or Without You" (U2 cover)
 "Cupid" (112 cover)
 "There Is a Light That Never Goes Out" (The Smiths cover)

Acting
In 2013, Lewis appeared as a fictional version of himself in the video game Grand Theft Auto V as a DJ for the in-game radio station Radio Mirror Park. His songs "Shooting Holes", "Forget", and "Old Love / New Love", a track he made specifically for the video game, were featured on the station.

Lewis Jr. made his feature film acting debut in Future World alongside James Franco, Milla Jovovich, Lucy Liu, Suki Waterhouse, Method Man, and Snoop Dogg.

Television appearances
 Conan
Episode #1183 (July 10, 2018) (song performed: "Saturdays")
As himself – musical guest 
 Late Night with Jimmy Fallon
Episode #1.435 (2011) (writer: "Castles in the Snow" / performer: "Castles in the Snow")
As himself – musical guest
 Conan
Episode No. 578 (Tuesday, June 3, 2014) (song performed: "To The Top")
As himself – musical guest
Season 22 Episode No. 27 (Tuesday, February 17, 2015) (song performed:"Turn Me Up")
 Late Show with David Letterman
As himself – musical guest
 Late Night with Seth Meyers
Season 2 Episode No. 59 (Wednesday, May 6, 2015) (song performed: "I'm Ready")
As himself – musical guest
 Comedy Bang Bang: Season 3 Episode No. 2 "Milkshake Movies" (July 31, 2014)
 The Late Late Show with James Corden: (Wednesday, July 29, 2015) (song performed: "To The Top")
As himself – musical guest

References

External links
 

1983 births
Living people
American electronic musicians
American alternative rock musicians
Warner Records artists
4AD artists
Dominican Republic emigrants to the United States